Annegret Strauch (born 1 December 1968 in Radebeul) is a German rower.

References 
 
 

1968 births
Living people
East German female rowers
German female rowers
Olympic rowers of Germany
Rowers at the 1988 Summer Olympics
Rowers at the 1992 Summer Olympics
Olympic gold medalists for East Germany
Olympic bronze medalists for Germany
Olympic medalists in rowing
Medalists at the 1992 Summer Olympics
Medalists at the 1988 Summer Olympics
World Rowing Championships medalists for East Germany
People from Meissen (district)
Sportspeople from Saxony